Heath Wood barrow cemetery is a Viking burial site near Ingleby, Derbyshire.

Description
Heath Wood contains a series of 59 barrows which is a Viking burial site near Ingleby, Derbyshire. The barrows are unusual because they are the only known Scandinavian cremation site in the British Isles. It is believed to be a war cemetery of the Viking Great Army which arrived in the area in 873 A.D. Early excavations by Thomas Bateman in May 1855 found that some of the mounds were empty cenotaph mounds where presumably the body was not available.

Excavations between 1998 and 2000 produced a number of finds which are available in Derby Museum. It is believed that these remains are from the same period as burials discovered in nearby Repton. However, the Repton burials are not cremations. This wood is currently leased by the Forestry Commission from the Church Commissioners and it is designated "Derbyshire 101" as a Scheduled Ancient Monument. 

The path that goes through the wood links Foremarke Hall with Knowle Hill which are two properties previously owned by the Burdett family together with the land belong to Heath Wood. Presumably, the path was useful when the family moved to Knowle Hill whilst building work was in progress in order to visit St Saviour's church which the family built in 1662. In the eighteenth century Heath Wood was actually a field and the growth of woodland has only happened since then. Without the woods being there then this burial place would have had a fine view of the Trent valley. The path that goes through the woods neatly misses any of the ancient barrows and it is believed that no barrows were removed to ease its path.

References

Archaeological sites in Derbyshire
Germanic archaeological sites
Scheduled monuments in Derbyshire
Viking buildings and structures